Highpointer Peak is a peak of the British Empire Range on Ellesmere Island.

British Empire Range
One-thousanders of Nunavut